Sam Killebrew (born April 13, 1945) is an American politician who has served in the Florida House of Representatives from the 41st district since 2016.

References

1945 births
Living people
Republican Party members of the Florida House of Representatives
21st-century American politicians